The following radio stations broadcast on AM frequency 1494 kHz:

Australia
VL2AY: Albury, New South Wales

China
Fujian RGD in Lianjiang
Hulun Buir in Hailar

Japan
JOYR in Okayama (RSK)
JOTL in Nayoro (HBC)

New Zealand
Radio Sport in Timaru
AM Network in Hamilton (Parliamentary programming)

The Philippines
DWSS: Manila
DXOC in Ozamis

References

Lists of radio stations by frequency